Fire corals (Millepora) are a genus of colonial marine organisms that exhibit physical characteristics similar to that of coral. The name coral is somewhat misleading, as fire corals are not true corals but are instead more closely related to Hydra and other hydrozoans, making them hydrocorals. They make up the only genus in the monotypic family Milleporidae.

Distinguishing characteristics
Fire corals have a bright, yellow-green to brown skeletal covering, and are widely distributed in tropical and subtropical waters. They appear in small, brush-like growths on rocks and coral. Divers often mistake fire coral for seaweed, and accidental contact is common. Upon contact, an intense pain can be felt, lasting from two days to two weeks. Occasional relapses of post-treatment inflammation are common. Prominent side effects can include skin irritation, stinging or burning pain, erythema (skin redness), fever, and/or urticarian (hives) lesions. These side effects are due to venom released from the nematocyte, as venom is part of the defense mechanism of the fire coral. Despite its mild to moderate potential for pain, the venom is nonlethal to humans. The very small nematocysts on fire corals contain tentacles, protruding  from numerous surface pores (similar to jellyfish stingers). In addition, fire corals have a sharp, calcified external skeleton that can scrape the skin.

Fire coral has several common growth forms; these include branching, plate, and encrusting. Branching fire coral adopts a calcareous structure which branches off into rounded, finger-like tips. Plate-growing fire coral forms a shape similar to that of fellow cnidarian lettuce corals - erect, thin sheets, which group together to form a colony. In encrusting fire coral, growth takes place on the surface structure of calcareous coral or gorgonian structures.

The gonophores in the family Milleporidae arise from the coenosarc (the hollow living tubes of the upright branching individuals of a colony), within chambers embedded entirely in the coenosteum (the calcareous mass forming the skeleton of a compound coral).

Distribution and habitat
Fire corals are found on reefs in tropical and subtropical waters, such as the Indian Ocean, Pacific Ocean, and Atlantic Ocean and the Caribbean Sea.<ref>Kropp, M.L. Parsley B. C. Burnett, Lee Omer. (2018). Millepora species(Fire Coral) Sting: A Case Reportand Review of Recommended Management'. Vol. 29. Issue. 4. Wilderness and Environmental Medicine. </ref> The highest densities of fire coral are found in the marine waters of South and Southeast Asia; from India in the west to as far east as French Polynesia; south to coastal northern Australia, and north to Okinawa and extreme southern Japan. They are common in all coastal regions of the Arabian Peninsula and the Persian Gulf, as well as off of South Africa, and up the entire eastern side of the African continent; Madagascar, Seychelles, Mauritius, the Maldives, Cape Verde and the Galápagos Islands support known populations of fire coral. Additionally, they are found throughout the Caribbean, along Brazil’s Atlantic coast (near the equator), and both the Pacific and Atlantic coasts of Panamá. Fire corals form extensive outcrops on projecting parts of reefs where the tidal currents are strongest.

Biology
The polyps of fire corals are near microscopic size and are mostly embedded in the skeleton and connected by a network of minute canals. All that is visible on the smooth surface are pores of two sizes: gastropores and dactylopores. In fact, Millepora means ‘thousand pores’. Dactylozooids have long fine hairs that protrude from the skeleton. The hairs possess clusters of stinging cells and capture prey, which is then engulfed by gastrozooids, or feeding polyps, situated within the gastropores. As well as capturing prey, fire corals gain nutrients via their special symbiotic relationship with algae known as zooxanthellae. The zooxanthellae live inside the tissues of the coral, and provide the coral with food, which they produce through photosynthesis, so require sunlight. In return, the coral provides the algae with protection and access to sunlight.

Reproduction in fire corals is more complex than in other reef-building corals. The polyps reproduce asexually, producing jellyfish-like medusae, which are released into the water from special cup-like structures known as ampullae. The medusae contain the reproductive organs that release eggs and sperm into the water. Fertilised eggs develop into free-swimming larvae that will eventually settle on the substrate and form new colonies. Fire corals can also reproduce asexually by fragmentation.Wilkinson, C. (2004) Status of Coral Reefs of the World. Australian Institute of Marine Science, Townsville, Australia.

Various fire corals are among the most common causes of minor stinging incidents in humans.

Threats and conservation
Fire corals face the many threats impacting coral reefs globally, including poor land management practices releasing more sediment, nutrients, and pollutants into the oceans and stressing the fragile reef ecosystem. Overfishing has ‘knock-on’ effects that result in the increase of macroalgae that can outcompete and smother corals, and fishing using destructive methods physically devastates the reef. A further potential threat is the increase of coral bleaching events, as a result of global climate change.

Most fire coral species have brittle skeletons that can easily be broken, for example, during storms, or by divers when diving for leisure, or when collecting fish for the aquarium trade. For instance, the yellowtail damselfish (Chrysiptera parasema) tends to dwell close to the branching fire coral colonies, and retreats into its branches when threatened. In Brazil, fire coral colonies are extensively damaged when harvesting the yellowtail damselfish, as the corals are often deliberately smashed and fishes hiding amongst the branches are ‘shaken out’ into plastic bags.

Fire corals are listed on Appendix II of the Convention on International Trade in Endangered Species (CITES).

Species

Fifteen species of Millepora are currently recognised:Millepora alcicornis Linnaeus, 1758Millepora boschmai de Weerdt & Glynn, 1991Millepora braziliensis Verrill, 1868Millepora complanata Lamarck, 1816Millepora dichotoma (Forsskål, 1775)Millepora exaesa (Forsskål, 1775)Millepora foveolata Crossland, 1952Millepora intricata Milne-Edwards & Haime, 1860Millepora laboreli Amaral, 2008Millepora latifolia Boschma, 1948Millepora nitida Verrill, 1868Millepora nodulosa Nemenzo, 1984Millepora platyphylla Hemprich & Ehrenberg, 1834Millepora squarrosa Lamarck, 1816Millepora tenera'' Boschma, 1948

Further reading

References

External links

 
 "Fire Coral Cuts Treatment" at WebMD
 http://www.emedicinehealth.com/wilderness_fire_coral_cuts/article_em.htm

Milleporidae